Hyderabad Hunters is a badminton team owned by Agile Entertainment Pvt. Ltd. for the Premier Badminton League (PBL). The team's home ground is Gachibowli Indoor Stadium, Hyderabad. The team is captained by the reigning world champion P. V. Sindhu.

Current squad

References

Premier Badminton League teams
Sport in Hyderabad, India